State Highway 239 (SH 239) is a Texas state highway that runs from Kenedy southwestward to Austwell.  The route was designated on December 22, 1936, cancelled temporarily on March 31, 1938, and redesignated on November 13, 1939. It was extended twice, once on February 28, 1966, from U.S. Highway 183 to U.S. Highway 77 (Future Interstate 69E) and again on November 25, 1975, it was extended southeast, replacing SH 113.

Junction list

References

239
Transportation in Karnes County, Texas
Transportation in Goliad County, Texas
Transportation in Refugio County, Texas